The following is the filmography of American stand-up comedian and actor Chris Rock.

Rock started his career as a cast member on Saturday Night Live from 1990 to 1993 alongside Adam Sandler, David Spade, and Chris Farley. He also starred on In Living Color from 1993 to 1994, and The Chris Rock Show from 1997 to 2000. During this time Rock gained stardom as a standup comedian releasing several comedy albums including Born Suspect (1991), Roll with the New (1997), and Bigger & Blacker (1999). He started his film career with minor film roles such as Beverly Hills Cop II (1987) before appearing in Lethal Weapon 4 (1998), Dogma (1999), and Nurse Betty (2000).

In 2001, Rock wrote, executive produced and starred in Down to Earth (2001), and starred and produced Pootie Tang (2001). Both of these projects he worked with Louis C.K. In 2003 he made his directorial debut with the political satire Head of State (2003), followed by his film as a director I Think I Love My Wife (2007), and Top Five (2014). He also starred in the comedies Death at a Funeral (2010), Grown Ups (2010), its 2013 sequel, and Dolemite Is My Name (2019). He has also appeared in the Netflix films starring Adam Sandler; Sandy Wexler (2017), and The Week Of (2018).

Rock has also made appearances in a variety of television shows including Louie (2011–2012), Comedians in Cars Getting Coffee (2013), Broad City (2015), Empire (2015), and Fargo (2020). He also appeared as himself in the documentaries The N-Word (2004), The Aristocrats (2005), and Good Hair (2009). He also is known for his vocal performances as titular protagonist of Osmosis Jones (2001), Marty the Zebra in DreamWorks Animation's Madagascar film franchise (2005-2012) and as Mooseblood in Jerry Seinfeld's Bee Movie (2007).

Film

Television

As executive producer

Music videos

Theatre

See also

References

External links
 
 

American filmographies
Director filmographies
Male actor filmographies
Filmography